The 2015 Sydney Darts Masters was the third staging of the tournament by the Professional Darts Corporation, as a fourth entry in the 2015 World Series of Darts. The tournament  featured 16 players (eight top PDC Players facing eight regional qualifiers) and was held at the Sydney Entertainment Centre in Sydney, Australia from 20–22 August 2015.

Phil Taylor was the defending champion after defeating Stephen Bunting 11–3 in the last year's final and he remained the only player to have won this event by claiming his third title with an 11–3 victory over Adrian Lewis. He also hit the first ever nine-dart finish in a World Series of Darts match, when he hit one in his semi-final victory over Peter Wright, which was Taylor's last televised nine-dart finish in his career.

Prize money
The total prize fund was A$220,000.

Qualifiers
The eight seeded PDC players were:

  Phil Taylor (winner)
  Michael van Gerwen (quarter-finals)
  Gary Anderson (quarter-finals)
  Peter Wright (semi-finals)
  James Wade (quarter-finals)
  Adrian Lewis (runner-up)
  Raymond van Barneveld (semi-finals)
  Stephen Bunting (quarter-finals)

The Oceanic qualifiers were:
  Simon Whitlock (first round)
  Paul Nicholson (first round)
  Laurence Ryder (first round)
  David Platt (first round)
  Craig Caldwell (first round)
  Cody Harris (first round)
  Tic Bridge (first round)
  Warren Parry (first round)

Draw

Broadcasting

The tournament was available in the following countries on these channels:

References

Sydney Darts Masters
Sydney Darts Masters
World Series of Darts
Sports competitions in Sydney